The International Network of Churches (INC), formerly Christian Outreach Centre (COC), is an Australian network of Pentecostal churches, most of them based in Queensland. It was established in 1974 what is now Citipointe Church in Brisbane. It is committed to biblical Christianity, with both the Apostles' Creed and Nicene Creed as its foundational beliefs.

Background
Clark Taylor was born in Queensland in 1937 and became a farmer with little formal education. After attending a Billy Graham Crusade in Brisbane in 1959, he was "born again", and in 1961 started training in Methodism. He contracted cerebral malaria in 1963, but believed himself to be miraculously healed by God in 1967, and during a service at Oxley Methodist Church in Brisbane thought he received a message from God telling him to obey James 5.  Later that year he received baptism in the Holy Spirit on the prayers of an Assembly of God pastor. In January 1968, he became an assistant minister, in charge of St. Paul's Church at Upper Mount Gravatt, and undertook various other duties until his resignation from the Methodist ministry in early 1970.

After a stint with another pastor,  Trevor Chandler (who had assisted Frank Houston in New Zealand and moved to Brisbane in 1972), at the Windsor Full Gospel Church, both pastors left to start Christian Life Centre Brisbane 1972. At the end of 1972, Taylor resigned from CLC (which later grew into a megachurch) and spent 18 months in travelling ministry.

History
Christian Outreach Centre was founded in 1974 in Brisbane by Pastor Clark Taylor. After 26 people had met in the Taylors’ home on 16 June, the following Sunday, 126 people took holy communion in a rented building, and in October that year the group purchased a Salvation Army property in the southern Brisbane suburb of Woolloongabba.  Three years later, COC had around 1,000 members and further churches were established across Queensland.

In 1978, the organisation became involved in education, and established three schools, in Brisbane (now Citipointe Christian College), Toowoomba (now Highlands Christian College), and Nambour (Christian Outreach College (Sunshine Coast), later Suncoast Christian College, situated at the nearby town of Woombye). In 1980, Victory College in Gympie was founded. It is Gympie’s leading P-12 Co-educational Christian School, with over 700 students. Christian Heritage College, a tertiary college, was later created as a teachers' college in Brisbane in 1986. It has since expanded into five fields – Business, Education, Liberal Arts/Humanities, Social Sciences and Ministries.

By 1988 the movement had grown within Australia and spread to New Zealand and Solomon Islands. In 2009, Pastor Ashley Schmierer, based in Brighton, England, was elected as International President.

Business names and status
Its registration as an incorporated charitable institution starts in 2000 as Christian Outreach Centre Mansfield and goes through a number of changes of name, with its business name registered as Christian Outreach Centre . Its status as a charitable institution, since December 2012, is based on two purposes: "Advancing religion", and "Purposes beneficial to the general public that may reasonably be regarded as analogous to, or within the spirit of, any of the other charitable purposes". In the financial year ending June 2021, it obtained around half of its total gross income (nearly ) from donations and bequests, and nearly 20 per cent (over ) from government grants. It has a large number of business and trading names, relating to its many schools, churches, charities and various businesses.

See also
Christian Outreach College (disambiguation), former name of several schools

Footnotes

References

External links

Evangelical parachurch organizations
Christian organizations established in 1974
Christian movements
Pentecostal churches in Australia
1974 establishments in Australia
Pentecostal denominations established in the 20th century